Ronald David Piper (born 16 March 1943 in Cresswell) is an English former professional footballer who played for Tottenham Hotspur.

Playing career
Piper began his career as an amateur with Arsenal. The inside forward joined Tottenham Hotspur in October 1960. Piper made just one appearance for Tottenham Hotspur in the final match of the 1962/63 season at Blackburn Rovers.  After leaving White Hart Lane Piper played for Guildford City.

References

External links
Wimbledon stats at AFCW

1943 births
Sportspeople from Northumberland
Living people
English footballers
English Football League players
Tottenham Hotspur F.C. players
Wimbledon F.C. players
Association football forwards